Dhoot is a surname. Notable people with the surname include:

Rajkumar Dhoot (born 1955), Indian politician
Venugopal Dhoot (born 1951), Indian businessman

Indian surnames